Honwee Mountain, east summit  and west summit , is a prominent mountain in the Taconic Mountains of western Massachusetts. The mountain is located in Pittsfield State Forest. The east (highest) summit is traversed by the Honwee Circuit multi-use trail. The west summit is crossed by the   Taconic Crest hiking trail and the  multi-use Taconic Skyline Trail. The mountain is wooded with northern hardwood forest species.

The east peak of Honwee mountain is located within the town of Lanesborough and the west peak in the town of Hancock. A shorter, middle summit , is located between the east and west peaks, but it lacks significant prominence over the connecting ridge it occupies. A prominent spur peak called The Pinnacle, is located to the west of the main ridgeline.

The Taconic Range ridgeline continues north from Honwee Mountain as Poppy Mountain, south as Berry Hill, and west across the Wyomanock Creek valley as West Hill. The southwest side of the mountain drains into Berry Pond Creek, then Wyomanock Creek, thence into Kinderhook Creek, the Hudson River and Long Island Sound. The northwest side drains into Kinderhook Creek. The east side drains into Lulu Creek and Churchill Brook, thence into Onota Lake, the Housatonic River, and Long Island Sound.

References
 Massachusetts Trail Guide (2004). Boston: Appalachian Mountain Club.
 Commonwealth Connections proposal PDF download. Retrieved March 2, 2008.
 AMC Massachusetts and Rhode Island Trail Guide (1989). Boston: Appalachian Mountain Club.
 "Greenways and Trails" Massachusetts DCR. Retrieved February 22, 2008.

External links
 Pittsfield State Forest map
 Pittsfield State Forest. Massachusetts DCR.

Mountains of Berkshire County, Massachusetts
Taconic Mountains
Lanesborough, Massachusetts